The history of deafness in Iceland includes the history of Icelandic Sign Language (ISL) and its status as the first language of the Deaf, the history of Icelandic Deaf education and Deaf organizations, and the status of hearing screenings in the country.

Language emergence 
Icelandic Sign Language (ISL), commonly known in Icelandic as ITM is the language of the Deaf community in Iceland. There are about 250–300 users of this language.

ISL is recognized by the Icelandic government as the first language of the deaf community in Iceland, followed by spoken language. It diverged from Danish Sign Language as a result of deaf children being previously sent to Copenhagen for schooling. The first school for the Deaf in Iceland was also taught by a former student of the Danish school, Páll Pálsson, who pioneered education in ISL.

Pálsson established his own school in Iceland and was the first teacher of the predecessor of ISL. Until he began teaching in 1867, students attended the Copenhagen school. The first community sign emerged in this school located in his own home where he began by teaching only three students. The variation of language he taught, pre-ISL use, was heavily influenced by Danish Sign Language since he was a student of the Danish school. There was heavy use of fingerspelling or "finger-language" as used in Pálsson's writings.

Previously, individuals in the hearing community have attributed ISL to being used as a tool to learn Icelandic. The deaf community in Iceland recognizes ISL as part of their identity and heritage in the Icelandic community. Language policy and the status of ISL is a collaborative effort between the Icelandic Sign Language community (users) and Icelandic government according to article 7 of the Act on the Status of the Icelandic Language and Icelandic Sign Language. The community will service and advise everything regarding ISL.

Languages used in the region include Danish, Icelandic, and ISL. Many who use ISL use the same variation because there is only one deaf school located in the capital of Reykjavik.

Significant organizations

Icelandic Association of the Deaf 
The Icelandic Association of the Deaf (IAD), officially established in 1960, is the top advocacy organization in Iceland led by deaf people for deaf people. It is the leading organization in expertise and servicing and has been a part of the European Union of the Deaf since 2005.

Its main goal is the protection, promotion, and fighting for the Deaf and hard-of-hearing community. More specifically, it intends to improve quality of life and fight for equal opportunities for its members. The first sign language dictionary was published by the IAD in 1978 containing about 700 Icelandic signs, including hundreds borrowed from other Nordic languages and commonly agreed-upon Nordic signs.

Nordic Council of the Deaf 
The Nordic Council of the Deaf was founded in 1907. It represents Denmark, Iceland, Norway, Sweden, Greenland, Finland, and the Faroe Islands.  Its mission is to raise awareness of the interests regarding the deaf in these countries. The political, cultural, and linguistic atmosphere of these countries are intertwined, so one of the original goals of the Nordic Council of the Deaf was to create a common Nordic Sign Language.

Communication Center for the Deaf and Hard of Hearing 
The Communication Center for the Deaf and Hard of Hearing (SHH) was a result of the Deaf education project that took place in Namibia (2006–2010). Its main initiative includes sharing resources for Deaf education across borders, sharing access to technologies with resources for deaf education, and to highlight how relevant sharing resources and expertise across borders is to Deaf education. The communication center has started the SignWiki Mobile Project as a resource for education. It estimates there to a 1 to 1000 ratio of deaf to hearing individuals in Iceland.

Human and civil rights 

After 20 years of campaigns, Icelandic Sign Language became an official language in 2011. The Act Respecting the Status of the Icelandic language and Icelandic Sign Language, No. 61/2011 Article 21, was established and stated, "that the Icelandic sign language is the first language of those who must rely on it for expression and communication, and of their children. It must be fostered and supported by public authorities. All persons who have a need for sign language must be given the opportunity to learn Icelandic sign language and to use it from the beginning of their language acquisition, or as soon as deafness, hearing impairment or deaf-blindness has been diagnosed. Their immediate family members shall have the same right"; this was reiterated by the United Nations Convention on the Rights of Persons with Disabilities (UNCRPD) and published by Iceland in 2018 addressing the rights of persons using ISL.

The Icelandic Parliament also passed legislation declaring ISL as the first language for people who rely on it, also stating language discrimination is prohibited.

Therefore, ISL is legally equal to spoken Icelandic language.

A recent study done on all deaf individuals who sign noted that although ISL has been legally recognized, there has been a continued struggle of the law not meeting the expectations of deaf individuals. The results of the study concluded that the participants feel as though equality to hearing individuals has not been achieved. This is in part due to the lack of solutions to obstacles presented to them by using ISL.

The European Federation of National Institutions for Language's Legal framework concerning Iceland states "The Icelandic sign language is the first language of those who have to use it for expression and interaction, as well as for their children. The state shall care for it and support it. Whoever needs the Icelandic sign language shall have the possibility to learn and use it as soon as his/her language acquisition starts, or from the time that the person has been recognized as deaf, hard of hearing or deaf and dumb. The same applies to their closest family members."

According to the Convention on the Rights of Persons with Disabilities (CRPD), Iceland stated it aims to "aims to promote independent living, combat prejudice and social exclusion, and involve persons with disabilities in decision-making processes" in an action plan adopted by the government in 2016.

Primary and secondary education 
In accordance with the law set out in 2011, Icelandic Sign Language is the official first language of the Deaf community in Iceland followed by spoken Icelandic. The Education system in Iceland emphasizes the principal of equal opportunity to receiving an education.

The Ministry of Education is responsible for all legislation concerning all school levels in Iceland (pre-primary through upper secondary education).

Most upper secondary schools offer special units in order to prepare disabled students for life post-education, but lacks support for students over the age of 16.

Deaf school in Iceland 
Before the school for the Deaf was established in Reykjavik, children were sent to the Royal Institute for the Deaf-Mute in Copenhagen. Once Páll Pálsson's school for the deaf was established, students aged 10–25) lived in Pálsson's home. Pálsson died in 1890 and his teachings remained relatively the same. In 1944, Deaf education changed completely in the deaf school. Under the new principal, Brandur Jónsson, oralism became the method of learning in the classrooms and all signing was banned. The renewed educational goal was to teach children to speak and understand spoken Icelandic. In the 1980s the education policy changed again; oralism proved unsuccessful as a teaching method and signing took precedent, although spoken Icelandic and lip-reading were primarily taught.

From the 1980s to the 1990s there were many changes in the education system at the Deaf school. New teaching methods and a shift to highlight ISL and Deaf culture and education became the main focus of the school. The first Deaf principal was not head until 1996, where bilingualism (ISL and written Icelandic) were the main goals to be taught.

Higher education 
Iceland has four levels of education of which only one is mandatory. Upper secondary education (framhaldsskóli) follows compulsory (mandatory) education (grunnskóli). In upper secondary education, anyone who has completed compulsory education can attend for no tuition charge. Ages for upper secondary education are usually 16–20 years of age. Anyone who has completed and has a diploma from upper secondary education can apply to receive higher education (háskólar) at the University of Iceland.

Besides paying for boarding, school supplies, and registration fees, tuition for all students is free.

The Ministry of Higher Education is responsible for legislation concerning Higher education institutions in Iceland. There are 8 institutions for higher education in Iceland:

 Bifröst University
 Iceland University of the Arts
 Reykjavik University
 The Agricultural University of Iceland
 Hólar University
 Akureyri University
 University of Iceland
 The Icelandic Centre for Research (RANNIS)

The University of Iceland offers several classes for a masters of Deaf studies for many different courses. Some examples of courses include Spanish, Global studies, and French studies among others. At the university, many courses are taught in English and many students receive some part of their education abroad.  Accommodations for Deaf or hard of hearing students include requesting interpretation, but whether it is required or not and statistics are unknown. Students are encouraged to contact a school counselor and teachers are encouraged to contact the coordinator of interpreter services.

The Ministry of Higher Education issues a National Qualification Framework for Iceland (80/2007)  with no mention of the Deaf or Hard of Hearing population in Iceland although according to a country report done in 2018, clauses include discrimination towards disabled students noting that it is not possible to meet their needs.

Whether or not disabled students take classes with a support worker is dependent on the students educational needs and the schools curriculum.

Employment 
After compulsory education is completed, students may decide on pursuing vocational trainings or upper secondary education. There is limited information about legislation and policies concerned with vocational training for disabled individuals seeking employment and especially for DHH people in the region. There are no specific frameworks about the needs of disabled students in vocational trainings.

The National Association of People with Disabilities in Iceland assists those with disabilities with job searches, including by providing them housing.

Research done by the Designs Project on employment for Deaf signers in Europe concluded that quantitatively it is hard to determine how deaf signers are in the workplace and to what extent education has an impact on employment outcomes. They found this to cover 16 countries of which Iceland was included in their research as well as similar Nordic countries like Denmark and Finland.

Although there is an action plan for people with disabilities that aligns with the CRPD's policies for increase employment in the disabled population, there are no measures to support the right of workplace accommodations in line with CRPD policy.

Early hearing screening and intervention 

In Iceland, all babies have access to early hearing screening programs and screening through the National Hearing and Speech Institute. Although screening is available, it is not obligatory. Parents are able to decide on screening attendance. The institute is paid for by the government as part of Iceland's healthcare system.

According to the Karolinska Institute of Sweden, neonatal screening is performed for "well" and "at-risk" babies in Iceland. At-risk refers to babies admitted to the neonatal intensive care unit (NICU) who are considered to be at risk for hearing loss, well refers to babies not born prematurely or who were not admitted to the NICU.

There is no preschool hearing screening; this screening was terminated in 2012. Preschool refers to children aged 3–6 years old.

The center of hearing and speech impairment in Iceland,  (HTI), was established in 1978. Its main goal was to service those with hearing and speech impairments by providing services in Iceland. These services include offering health servicing: offering diagnosis, offering treatments, providing cochlear implants, hearing aids, and other hearing assistance devices.

Language preservation and revitalization 

ITM is classified by many sources as an indigenous minority sign language and the only traditional sign language in Iceland as well as a shared-signing language. There is an estimation of only about 250 first-language users of ISL and 100-1500 hearing speakers most of which are related or connected to first language users.

Issues that would pose a threat to ITM are mainly due to community external forces like technology, increased immigration and use of foreign languages, as well as demographic changes. Other causes were due to generational gaps, transmission barriers, and societal ignorance.

Since 1960, increased immigration, increased birth rate and higher life expectancy have contributed to a rapidly changing demographic in the region. There was an estimated influx of over 100 languages from over 100 countries living in Iceland in 2011. This growing population of foreign language speakers constitutes about 10% of Icelands present inhabitants and 80% of children are growing up in multilingual households. This change to the linguistic landscape pose a threat to native ITM and the use of it moving forward as people acquire language skills other than Icelandic. Iceland has worked to track who uses ITM and the various levels of exposure to the language and found that roughly .005% of the total population (in 2020) uses ITM.

Studies have also noted that ITM is typically not taught by parents to their deaf children as a first language and usually teaching is influenced by the multilingualism of other users, which is a proposition as to why the language can be considered endangered. Because ITM is a second language, usually not transmitted directly by parents, that means the quality of ITM acquisition is dependent upon the teachings learners do receive by non-native input of the language (second generation language users) of hearing and deaf backgrounds and multilingual interactions.

Transmission barriers of the language stem from the aforementioned reason can be combatted by preservation of ITM in literacy curriculums and thorough documentation of ITM and its native speaker's "perception of the world around them" to increase proficiency of the language. One specific barrier, audism, could be faced by the protection of the language becoming politically differentiated from Europe.

References

External links
 Félag Heyrnalausra: About the Association
 Initial report submitted by Iceland under article 35 of the Convention due in 2018: Convention on the Rights of Persons with Disabilities
 Act on the status of the Icelandic language and Icelandic sign language

Wikipedia Student Program
Iceland
Disability in Iceland